The Bee Network is a proposed integrated transport network for Greater Manchester, composed of bus, tram, cycling and walking routes. Transport for Greater Manchester is expected to have the network operational by 2024, with commuter rail services expected to be joining the network in 2030. Initially revealed in 2018, the project is aiming to create a London-style transport system, to encourage more people to take public transport instead of cars.

The network's main goal is to reduce the percentage of car journeys throughout the region from 60% to 50% by 2040. The design of the network will be inspired around the Greater Manchester symbol, the worker bee, with bus and tram liveries coloured yellow and black to represent this.

History
The Bee Network was first proposed in 2018 by Chris Boardman, the region's walking and cycling commissioner, and former Olympic gold medalist.

In June 2022, Mayor of Greater Manchester Andy Burnham announced capped fares for buses from 2023 in order to help with cost-of-living rises.

The first fleet of 50 Alexander Dennis Enviro400EV battery electric buses is intended to be rolled out across Bolton, Wigan and parts of Bury and Salford from 17 September 2023. Go North West and Diamond North West have been awarded two large franchises and seven small franchises, respectively, displacing the current operations of First Greater Manchester and Stagecoach Manchester in this area. The fleet will be expanded by an additional 50 Enviro400EV buses in Oldham, Rochdale and the remainder of Bury in March 2024, with bus operations in the rest of the city region becoming regulated by January 2025. These bus services will operate alongside the Bee Network cycle hire bikes and the existing Metrolink network.

The cycle scheme launched in late 2021 using Beryl bikes.

Design
The design of the network will be based around the worker bee. The worker bee is the most well known symbol representing the city and region, and was adopted during the industrial revolution. The liveries of the trams, buses and bikes will be yellow and black, representing the worker bee. The facilities supporting the network will also follow this design.

See also
Bus Services Act 2017

References

External links
Destination: Bee Network
The Bee Network vision

Transport in Greater Manchester
2023 establishments in England